Mileece is the stage name of Mileece Abson, an English sound artist and environmental designer. She makes music with plants. She is the daughter of music video director Nick Abson.

Biography
Mileece was born in 1978 in London, UK. Her father is Nick Abson. She spent her early life in England and California.

Work
Her Formations EP was released in 2003 on Lo Recordings. Following that release she toured with Múm, Mice Parade and HIM. Her live show consisted of SuperCollider generative compositions with custom made instruments.

Mileece calls her sound art, aesthetic sonification, which is a way of relaying sound data into a representative mode that can be understood by all audiences.

In September 2015, at Sonos Studio LA, she exhibited a sound environment installation, called Sonic Garden, using plants and the Sonos Smart System. The installation was interactive and the audience were able to touch and interact with the plants.

She is featured in the upcoming documentary, microfemininewarfare: exploring sound in electronic music (2016) alongside artists such as Mira Calix, Vaccine, Rucyl and others .

Discography

EPs, singles and compilations

 , 2002
 , 2006

References

External links 
 

British sound artists
1978 births
Living people
Planet Mu artists